Galyamov, sometimes transliterated as Galliamov or Galiamov, is a Russian-language surname.

The female form is Galyamova, sometimes transliterated as Galliamova or Galiamova.

People
Aleksandr Galliamov (born 1999), Russian pair skater
Alisa Galliamova (born 1972), Russian chess player
Marat Galyamov (born 1997), Russian footballer
Nadezhda Galyamova (born 1959), Russian long-distance runner

Russian-language surnames